Zeytinliköy, also known by its former Greek name Ágioi Theódoroi, is a village on the island of Imbros in northwestern Turkey. It is part of the Gökçeada District of Çanakkale Province. Its population is 179 (2022).

Geography 
It is located 3 km west of the only town of the island, Çınarlı (or in Greek Panagia Balomeni), and 10 km west from the central port of the island. It stands at an altitude of approximately 100m nearby Kastri hill.

History and Demographics 
The village is one of the oldest settlements of the island of Imbros that is still inhabited. There are 3 Greek Orthodox Churches in the village. The village had a total population of 179 in 2022, a notable increase since 2007, when it only had 86 inhabitants. It is one of the few predominantly Greek Orthodox settlements in Turkey, with the Greek population ranging at around 80%, and has a Greek mayor, Efstratios Zounis. A Greek minority primary school and kindergarten are operating in the village.

Notable people 
Apostolos Christodoulou (1856-1917), Greek theologist and priest
Bartholomew I of Constantinople (1940-), Ecumenical Patriarch of Constantinople
Archbishop Iakovos of America (1911-2005)
Spyros Meletzis (1906-2003), Greek photographer

References 

Imbros
Greeks in Turkey
Villages in Gökçeada District